5-hydroxytryptamine (serotonin) receptor 3B, also known as HTR3B, is a human gene. The protein encoded by this gene is a subunit of the 5-HT3 receptor.

References

Further reading

External links
 

Serotonin receptors
Ion channels